

First team squad

Transfers

Summer

In:

Out:

Winter

In:

Out:

Nemzeti Bajnokság I

League table

Results summary

Results by round

Matches

Hungarian Cup

UEFA Cup

First qualifying round

Second qualifying round

Statistics

Appearances and goals
Last updated on 16 June 1999.

|-
|colspan="14"|Players no longer at the club:

|}

Top scorers
Includes all competitive matches. The list is sorted by shirt number when total goals are equal.
Last updated on 16 June 1999.

Disciplinary record
Includes all competitive matches. Players with 1 card or more included only.

Last updated on 16 June 1999.

Overall
{|class="wikitable"
|-
|Games played || 40 (34 PNB, 2 Hungarian Cup and 4 UEFA Cup)
|-
|Games won || 23 (19 PNB, 1 Hungarian Cup and 3 UEFA Cup)
|-
|Games drawn || 7 (7 PNB, 0 Hungarian Cup and 0 UEFA Cup)
|-
|Games lost || 10 (8 PNB, 1 Hungarian Cup and 1 UEFA Cup)
|-
|Goals scored || 81
|-
|Goals conceded || 50
|-
|Goal difference || +31
|-
|Yellow cards || 65
|-
|Red cards || 6
|-
|rowspan="1"|Worst discipline ||  Csaba Vámosi (9 , 1 )
|-
|rowspan="1"|Best result || 8–1 (H) v CE Principat - (UEFA Cup) - 29-7-1998
|-
|rowspan="1"|Worst result || 1–6 (A) v Debrecen - (PNB) - 10-4-1999
|-
|rowspan="1"|Most appearances ||  András Telek (40 appearances)
|-
|rowspan="1"|Top scorer ||  Imre Szabics (13 goals)
|-
|Points || 76/120 (63.33%)
|-

References

External links
 Official Website
 UEFA
 fixtures and results

1998-99
Hungarian football clubs 1998–99 season